Just My Luck is a 1933 British comedy film directed by Jack Raymond and starring Ralph Lynn, Winifred Shotter, Davy Burnaby and Robertson Hare. The screenplay was written by Ben Travers based on a 1932 Aldwych farce by H.F. Maltby, Fifty-Fifty, adapted from the French play Azaïs by Louis Verneuil and Georges Berr.

Plot summary
A shy teacher takes over the running of a hotel.

Cast
 Ralph Lynn as David Blake
 Winifred Shotter as Peggy Croft
 Davy Burnaby as Sir Charles Croft
 Robertson Hare as Trigg
 Vera Pearce as Lady Croft
 Frederick Burtwell as Stromboli
 Phyllis Clare as Babs

Critical reception
In 1933, the Melbourne Argus wrote, "one has become accustomed to seeing Ralph Lvnn as Ralph Lynn in every part which he plays. His appearances in the opening sequences of Just My Luck (at the Majestic) as a music teacher who expects everyone to kick him down the back stairs raises hopes that at last one is to see him subordinate himself to a character. The hopes are refreshing but fragile, like a glass of iced lager in the tropics - not that it matters much. Ralph Lynn as Ralph Lynn is as diverting a spectacle as the British screen can offer. The attitude to life of Mr. Blake, the music master, Is expounded in a single phrase. "I wonder why that didn't hit me," he ponders when a loose slate slides from a rooftop and shatters at his feet. Poor Mr. Blake has had 35 years of bad luck...Mr. Lynn contrives to leaven his foolery with touches of genuine pathos, but when his luck changes to prove the comforting theory that a man has as much good as bad fortune in his life, he fairly romps in his Rookery Nook style, through broader and yet broader farce. It is all very good fun, though. Mr. Lynn is supported by an able cast, which includes Winifred Shotter and Robertson Hare."

References

External links
 

1933 films
1933 comedy films
Films based on adaptations
Films based on works by Louis Verneuil
Films set in hotels
British comedy films
British black-and-white films
British remakes of French films
British and Dominions Studios films
Films shot at Imperial Studios, Elstree
1930s English-language films
1930s British films
English-language comedy films